The Asian Women Writers' Collective (AWWC), formerly known as the Asian Women Writers Workshop, was an organization of British Asian women writers. Founded by the writer and activist Ravinder Randhawa in 1984, the AAWC provided a platform for several British Asian women to enter writing, including Ravinder Randhawa, Meera Syal, Leena Dhingra, Tanika Gupta and Rukhsana Ahmad.

History
The Asian Women Writers' Workshop was founded in London in 1984. Its aim was to support creative writing by Asian women and increase access to publishers. It was supported by Black Ink Collective, and funded by the Greater London Council (GLC). After the GLC's 1986 abolition, it received funding from Greater London Arts Association and Lambeth Council.

The group grew from a core group of eight South Asian members to a national membership of over a hundred<Veena Stephenson, coordinator of AWWC>, participating together in creative writing exercises and sharing work with each other. In 1987 they changed their name to Asian Women Writers' Collective, with some political debate over whether to include the term "Black" in their name:

 
Moving beyond its original South Asian membership, in 1992 the collective explicitly adopted a wider definition of the term "Asian", to include those from China, Japan, Korea and Turkey.

Two AAWC anthologies – Right of Way (1988) and Flaming Spirit (1994) – opened up opportunities for previously unpublished AAWC members. Though the AAWC was based in London, its postal membership scheme enabled writers outside London to receive feedback on their writing, so that Flaming Spirit also included writers based in Sheffield, Birmingham, Manchester and Cardiff.

In 1991 the AAWC lost its Arts Association funding, and from 1996 Lambeth Council also started cutting funding. Around early 1997 the organization ceased activity. Its papers are held at the Birmingham Museum and Art Gallery.

Anthologies

References

External links
 Asian Women's Writers Collective at the Spoken Word Archive

British writers' organisations
Organizations for women writers
Asian-British culture
Women's collectives
Women's organisations based in the United Kingdom
Arts organizations established in 1984
Arts organizations disestablished in 1997
British Asian writers
20th-century British women writers